Forest Grove is an unincorporated community in Buckingham Township in Bucks County, Pennsylvania, United States. Forest Grove is located at the intersection of Forest Grove Road and Lower Mountain Road.

References

Unincorporated communities in Bucks County, Pennsylvania
Unincorporated communities in Pennsylvania